During One Night also released as Night of Passion is a 1961 British drama film directed by Sidney J. Furie and starring Don Borisenko and Susan Hampshire.

It was Susan Hampshire's first film role.

It was Walton Studios' last production.

It is a fairly gritty but unusual plot line, involving nudity and deep sexual subjects.

Plot
David is a Captain in the USAF based in the south of England in the Second World War. His logic and actions are thrown off course when Mike his co-pilot is seriously injured during a mission. Mike survives the injuries but the loss of his genitals drives him to suicide.

David sets out on a night of potential passion wishing to ensure that he does not die a virgin.

Handsome in his uniform but chain-smoking and very nervous he first finds a prostitute through a friend. He pays his £5 and the girl is very understanding if somewhat utilitarian in her approach but David is unable to perform. He asks that she does not tell her friends and is rushed off for the next client to appear.

Next he goes to a dance. His first target says they have not been properly introduced then his luck seems to change and a pretty girl (Jackie Collins) first dances with him then asks him to come home. It is a ruse though and her male friends appear outside and mug him and steal his money before heading to the next dance.

David heads to a nice country pub to drown his sorrows. By closing time he is unconscious. The landlady tells her daughter Jean (Hampshire) to give him ten minutes to leave then to call the military police. However, she likes him. She tries to sober him up and when the MPs arrive she hides him. He tells her of his thoughts. She strips and lies with him but he is again unable to perform.

In the early hours they walk back towards the camp but have to hide from the MPs again. David goes a bit crazy and tells the MPs to shoot him. He leaves Jean back at the pub. Her mum wakes and asks where she has been.

David hands himself to the village police and gets locked in a cell. His cigar smoking Major comes to find out what is going on. They drive back in a Jeep. David (who is driving) philosophises about death. He stops and gets out. He pauses then runs off into a field - wanting the Major to shoot him= which he does. David is uninjured. He accepts a cigar as they philosophise further about missions and death.

They drive back to town and the Major leaves him to say goodbye to Jean. He puts a coin in a fortune-telling machine and it says "your love will be returned". He starts to play darts. They sit and drink coffee. She says she loves him. He says how can he love her when he is not a man. then he says it.. They disappear behind the couch and next we see them lying side by side in front of the log fire and he lights a cigarette on the fire.

He is a man at last. He is no longer afraid to die and flies off to carry out his final mission.

Cast
 Don Borisenko as David
 Susan Hampshire as Jean
 Sean Sullivan as Major
 Joy Webster as Prostitute
 Graydon Gould as Mike
 Tom Busby as Sam
 Alan Gibson as Harry
 Barbara Ogilvie as Mother
 Jackie Collins as Girl
 Michael Golden as Constable
 Roy Stephens as Driver
 Colin Maitland as Gunner
 Pamela Barney as Nurse
 John Bloomfield as M.P. Sgt.
 Sean McCan as M.P.
 Barry McClean as Tough

References

External links
 

1961 films
Films directed by Sidney J. Furie
1961 drama films
British drama films
1960s English-language films
1960s British films